Ligeti Stadion is a multi-use stadium in Vác, Hungary.  It is used mostly for football matches and is the home stadium of Vác FC.  The stadium is able to hold 9,000 people.

External links
Stadion Városi Vác at magyarfutball.hu

Varosi Vac
Dunakanyar-Vác FC
Buildings and structures in Vác
Buildings and structures in Pest County